The 1987 Utah State Aggies football team represented Utah State University during the 1987 NCAA Division I-A football season as a member of the Pacific Coast Athletic Association (PCAA). The Aggies were led by second-year head coach Chuck Shelton and played their home games at Romney Stadium in Logan, Utah. They finished the season with a record of five wins and six losses (5–6, 4–3 PCAA).

Schedule

References

Utah State
Utah State Aggies football seasons
Utah State Aggies football